The 2013–14 Premier League (known as the Barclays Premier League for sponsorship reasons) was the 22nd season of the Premier League, the top-flight English professional league for men's football clubs, and the 115th season of top-flight English football overall. The fixtures were announced on 19 June 2013. The season started on Saturday 17 August 2013, and concluded on Sunday 11 May 2014.

On the final day of the season, Manchester City sealed their fourth league title and second Premier League title with a 2–0 victory over West Ham United, finishing with 86 points. Liverpool had looked on course to win the title with two weeks to go, but a loss and a draw in two of their last three matches, combined with Manchester City winning their final five league matches, ultimately meant they finished in second place with 84 points. Chelsea finished third and Arsenal, who led the table for the longest period, finished fourth. Manchester United had a disappointing season attempting to defend their title and ended up seventh, the worst title defence since the 1994–95 champions Blackburn Rovers finished 7th the following season. Norwich City, Fulham, and Cardiff City finished in the bottom three and were relegated to the Football League Championship.

Luis Suárez was the top scorer with 31 goals, and was also named Player of the Season. Goalkeepers Wojciech Szczęsny of Arsenal and Petr Čech of Chelsea led the league with 16 clean sheets each. Tony Pulis of Crystal Palace won the Manager of the Season award.

Season summary
The 380 fixtures for the 2013–14 Premier League season were announced on 19 June 2013. The television broadcast rights were given two-to-three weeks later. The season started on Saturday 17 August 2013, and concluded on Sunday 11 May 2014. During the 2013–14 season, the Premier League used goal-line technology for the first time.

During the 2013–14 season, first place changed hands 25 times, compared to just four times during the 2012–13 season. That represented the most lead changes since the 2001–02 season – which had 29, the most ever. The championship was not decided until the final day of play for just the seventh time in league history. Manchester City won the league with a 2–0 victory over West Ham United on the final day, finishing with 86 points. In total, Manchester City led the league just 14 days throughout the season en route to their second championship in the last three seasons. The club scored 102 goals, one short of the record, while also conceding the second fewest goals in the league.

With two weeks to go, Liverpool looked on course to win the championship before they had a loss and a draw in two of their final three games. The team ended up in second place with 84 points. Chelsea came third, while perennial power and 2013 champions Manchester United had a disappointing season under new manager David Moyes (who was sacked in April) and finished seventh. It was their first finish outside the top four in Premier League history, their worst finish overall since 1989–90, and the first time they had not qualified for European football in 25 years. Southampton's eighth-place finish and Everton's 72 points were club records.

Sunderland became only the second team in the Premier League era to avoid relegation having been bottom of the table on Christmas Day. Defeat at home to Everton on 12 April left Gus Poyet's side bottom of the table, seven points from safety (albeit with two games in hand). The club's 'great escape' began with a draw away at eventual champions Manchester City, followed by a run of four wins, including remarkable away victories at Chelsea and Manchester United. The side's survival was confirmed by a 2–0 victory over West Bromwich Albion on 7 May. Norwich City, Fulham, and Cardiff City were the bottom three teams and were relegated to the Football League Championship.

Two teams (Manchester City and Liverpool) scored more than 100 goals for the first time in Premier league history. The feat had only once been achieved before – by Chelsea in 2009–10. Luis Suárez won the golden boot for most goals with 31, ahead of teammate Daniel Sturridge who came second with 21 goals. Wojciech Szczęsny of Arsenal and Petr Čech of Chelsea led the league with 16 clean sheets each. In a game against Southampton, Asmir Begović became just the fifth goalkeeper in league history to score. Begovic's goal was also the fastest of the season, occurring just 12 seconds into the game. Mile Jedinak had the most tackles with 133. Chelsea manager José Mourinho lost a home game for the first time in his Premier League career, losing to Sunderland and ending a run of 77-straight home games unbeaten, stretching over two stints as Chelsea manager.

Teams
Twenty teams competed in the league – the top seventeen teams from the previous season and the three teams promoted from the Championship. The promoted teams were Cardiff City, Hull City and Crystal Palace, returning to the top flight after absences of fifty-one, three and eight years respectively. This was also Cardiff City's first season in the Premier League. They replaced Wigan Athletic, Reading and Queens Park Rangers, who were relegated after spending eight, one and two years in the top flight respectively.

Stadiums and locations

''Note: Table lists clubs in alphabetical order.

Personnel and kits

Note: Flags indicate national team as has been defined under FIFA eligibility rules. Players may hold more than one non-FIFA nationality.

 Additionally, referee kits are now being made by Nike, sponsored by EA Sports, and Nike has a new match ball, the Incyte Premier League.

Managerial changes
A record 10 managers left their position mid-season during the 2013–14 campaign.

League table

Results

Season statistics

Scoring
 First goal: Daniel Sturridge for Liverpool against Stoke City (37th minute, 13:22 BST) (17 August 2013)
 Fastest goal: 12 seconds (Asmir Begović (GK); Stoke City 1–1 Southampton 2 November 2013)
 Largest winning margin: 7 goals
 Manchester City 7–0 Norwich City (2 November 2013)
 Highest scoring game: 9 goals
 Manchester City 6–3 Arsenal (14 December 2013)
 Cardiff City 3–6 Liverpool (22 March 2014)
 Most goals scored in a match by a single team: 7 goals
 Manchester City 7–0 Norwich City (2 November 2013)
 Most goals scored in a match by a losing team: 3 goals
 Sunderland 3–4 Chelsea (4 December 2013)
 Manchester City 6–3 Arsenal (14 December 2013)
 Stoke City 3–5 Liverpool (12 January 2014)
 Aston Villa 4–3 West Bromwich Albion (29 January 2014)
 Liverpool 4–3 Swansea City (23 February 2014)
 Cardiff City 3–6 Liverpool (22 March 2014)

Top scorers

Hat-tricks

4 Player scored four goals

Clean sheets

Player

Club
 Most clean sheets: 18
 Chelsea
 Fewest clean sheets: 5
 Fulham

Discipline

Player
Most yellow cards: 11
 Pablo Zabaleta (Manchester City)
Most red cards: 3
 Wes Brown (Sunderland)

Club

Most yellow cards: 78
Aston Villa
Most red cards: 7
Sunderland

Awards

Monthly awards

Annual awards

Premier League Manager of the season
Tony Pulis won the Premier League Manager of the Season award.

Premier League Player of the season
The Premier League Player of the Season was awarded to Luis Suárez.

PFA Players' Player of the Year
The PFA Players' Player of the Year was awarded to Luis Suárez. The other nominees were; Steven Gerrard, Eden Hazard, Adam Lallana, Daniel Sturridge and  Yaya Touré.

PFA Team of the Year

PFA Young Player of the Year
The PFA Young Player of the Year was also awarded to Eden Hazard.

FWA Footballer of the Year
The FWA Footballer of the Year was also awarded to Luis Suárez.

Premier League Golden Glove
The Premier League Golden Glove award was won by Petr Čech of Chelsea and Wojciech Szczęsny of Arsenal.

Premier League Fair Play League
The Premier League Fair Play League was topped by Liverpool.

Average attendances

References

 
Premier League seasons
Eng
1